Inta Feldmane (born 1959) is a Latvian politician. She is a member of the LPP/LC and a deputy of the 9th Saeima (Latvian Parliament). She began her current term in parliament on November 16, 2006.

External links
Saeima website

1959 births
Living people
Latvia's First Party/Latvian Way politicians
Deputies of the Saeima
Women deputies of the Saeima

Deputies of the 9th Saeima
21st-century Latvian women politicians